Forest Friends is a French animated television series initially broadcast on TF1, and later rerun on French children's network TiJi. Along with the CGI series The Odd Family, this was one of the first shows produced by Timoon Animation, a company created by Philippe Mounier. 52 episodes were produced.

Several of the show's tie-in books have been written by Valérie Baranski, the screenwriter for another TF1 cartoon, The Bellflower Bunnies.

Synopsis
In the series, a wildfire has driven away many species of forest animals, who reluctantly must live uneasily with each other. But seven young open-minded survivors taught by their mentor the Old Oak of the Forest, step forth to prove that the animals no matter how different they are from each other, can live and work together as a community in peace and friendship. Frequently the rats cause trouble and inconvenience for the animals.

English voice cast 
 Jodi Forrest
 Barbara Weber-Scaff
 Sharon Mann-Vallet
 Matthew Géczy
 Paul Bandey
 Allan Wenger
 David Gasman

Characters
Jeff - An athletic squirrel who used to live in Squirrel City and now lives in a cabin not far from the bakery. He has a crush on Naomi
Naomi - A mouse who loves to read books and has a crush on Jeff
Achille - A boar and good friend of Jeff who can sometimes be a bit of a show off. He lives in a wooden board house
Danny - A fox who is quite a prankster and a scaredy cat
Gladys - A bear who loves to eat food and has some sort of love=hate relationship with Danny due to her fear of foxes
Martin and Zoe - Twin rabbit siblings who always stick together and take situations cautiously
Old Oak - A Living Tree who teaches the children all about the forest and the advantage of working together. He is Titan's father. He originated from an oak tree struck by a shooting star and Titan spawned as a sapling near one of his roots. From the sixth episode onwards he wears glasses.
Titan - A Living Tree derived from a Cherry Tree and son of Old Oak. He is friends with Jeff and others
Ratasha and Rascal - Rat siblings who live in a bare dusty part of the forest in an outhouse and they cause trouble for others
Jeff's Parents - The Father is named Jack and works as the speaker and leader of the village council meetings. The mother is named Jenny and works as a librarian of the public library.
Naomi's Parents - The Mother is named Maggie and the Father is named Boris. They both work as doctors
Sophia - Naomi's older sister. Danny once had an unrequited crush on Sophia
Achille's Parents - The Father named Roger does carpentry and the Mother named Margery does sculpting
Lily - Achille's baby sister
Danny's Mother - She is named Meryl and works as a newscaster for the local Gazette
Danny's Father - He is named Joe and works as a traveling actor
Didoo - Danny's baby brother
Gladys’s Parents - The Father named Billy works as a baker and the Mother named Milly works in a grocery store
Zoe’s and Martin’s Parents - The father named Jimmy is a gardener. The mother named Rose looks after the house and in episode 6 teaches the children
Ratasha's and Rascal's Parents - The mother is impatient and bossy sort and the father is an indifferent and careless sort
Tanja – A squirrel, who likes Jeff and makes Naomi sad and jealous, and Naomi sees her like a rival for Jeff’s affection
Leon – A wolf who gets lost from his parents during snow season. He's accused by some of the adults of wanting to eat them even though he's nice
Basher – A deer who appears in once in episode 35. Jeff and Danny fight over him and he becomes friends with both of them

Episode list

References

External links

Official site (TF1)
Official site (TiJi)
Episode list at AnimezVous
Screenshots from Buena Vista's Region 2 version

2006 French television series debuts
2007 French television series endings
2000s French animated television series
Australian Broadcasting Corporation original programming
French children's animated adventure television series
French children's animated fantasy television series
TF1 original programming
Animated television series about children
Animated television series about mammals
Animated television series about squirrels